Vozzhayevka is a rural locality (a selo) in Vozzhayevsky Selsoviet of Belogorsky District, Amur Oblast, Russia. The population was 5,068 as of 2018. There are  20 streets.

Geography 
Vozzhayevka is located on Trans-Siberian Railway, 34 km southeast of Belogorsk (the district's administrative centre) by road. Amurskoye is the nearest rural locality.

References 

Rural localities in Belogorsky District